Springfield Township may refer to:

Illinois
 Springfield Township, Sangamon County, Illinois

Indiana
 Springfield Township, Allen County, Indiana
 Springfield Township, Franklin County, Indiana
 Springfield Township, LaGrange County, Indiana
 Springfield Township, LaPorte County, Indiana

Iowa
 Springfield Township, Cedar County, Iowa
 Springfield Township, Kossuth County, Iowa
 Springfield Township, Winneshiek County, Iowa

Michigan
 Springfield Township, Kalkaska County, Michigan
 Springfield Township, Oakland County, Michigan

Minnesota
 Springfield Township, Cottonwood County, Minnesota

Missouri
 Springfield Township, Greene County, Missouri
 Springfield Township, Henry County, Missouri

New Jersey
 Springfield Township, Burlington County, New Jersey
 Springfield Township, Union County, New Jersey

North Dakota
 Springfield Township, Towner County, North Dakota

Ohio
 Springfield Township, Clark County, Ohio
 Springfield Township, Gallia County, Ohio
 Springfield Township, Hamilton County, Ohio
 Springfield Township, Jefferson County, Ohio
 Springfield Township, Lucas County, Ohio
 Springfield Township, Mahoning County, Ohio
 Springfield Township, Muskingum County, Ohio
 Springfield Township, Richland County, Ohio
 Springfield Township, Ross County, Ohio
 Springfield Township, Summit County, Ohio
 Springfield Township, Williams County, Ohio

Pennsylvania
 Springfield Township, Bradford County, Pennsylvania
 Springfield Township, Bucks County, Pennsylvania
 Springfield Township, Delaware County, Pennsylvania
 Springfield Township, Erie County, Pennsylvania
 Springfield Township, Fayette County, Pennsylvania
 Springfield Township, Huntingdon County, Pennsylvania
 Springfield Township, Mercer County, Pennsylvania
 Springfield Township, Montgomery County, Pennsylvania
 Springfield Township, York County, Pennsylvania

See also
Springfield (disambiguation)
 Springfield Township High School, Erdenheim, Pennsylvania
 Springfield Township School District, Montgomery County, Pennsylvania

Township name disambiguation pages